John Jairo Montaño (born April 17, 1984) is a Colombian defender who currently plays for Deportes Quindío in the Colombian Categoría Primera B.

External links
BDFA profile 

1984 births
Living people
Colombian footballers
Categoría Primera A players
Categoría Primera B players
Deportivo Cali footballers
Deportes Tolima footballers
Atlético F.C. footballers
Cortuluá footballers
Millonarios F.C. players
Boyacá Chicó F.C. footballers
Deportivo Pasto footballers
Deportivo Pereira footballers
Cúcuta Deportivo footballers
Unión Magdalena footballers
Deportes Quindío footballers
Association football fullbacks
Footballers from Cali